Daniele Bracciali and Potito Starace were the defending champions, but could not defend their title due to being banned from tennis for betting offences.

Guido Andreozzi and Andrés Molteni won the title after defeating Marcelo Arévalo and Miguel Ángel Reyes-Varela 6–1, 6–2 in the final.

Seeds

Draw

References
 Main Draw

Citta di Caltanissetta - Doubles
2016 Doubles